The Mars Sample Recovery Helicopters are a pair of robotic unmanned helicopters being developed by the engineers of the American company AeroVironment Inc. and proposed in March 2022 as a means of delivering Martian soil samples from the sample depots made by the Perseverance rover to the location of the Sample Retrieval Lander (SRL) that will load these samples onto the Mars Ascent Vehicle (MAV), which, in accordance with the NASA-ESA Mars Sample Return program, will deliver them to low Martian orbit for future return to earth.

Background of the project 
While Perseverance is busy collecting and caching samples on Mars, scientists and technicians at JPL are developing helicopters that will retrieve them. The plan flashed in June 2022, when MSR campaign needed a helicopter to recover sample tubes this bring the sample recovery helicopters into play.

Design 

The Martian Sample recovery helicopters are being developed by AeroVironment, Inc. based on technology they previously demonstrated on the Ingenuity  coaxial helicopter as a part of NASA's Perseverance rover.

Key components were modified based on lessons learned from Ingenuity. Flight aspects, including speed, flight time, range are the same as it is on Ingenuity. The power-to-weight ratio of the device will increase, for which the area of the solar battery and the capacity of its batteries will be increased. The control system of the upper screw will be somewhat simplified, and the engine power will increase. The overall dimensions of the helicopter will be slightly larger. In total, it is planned to send two such machines to Mars. Along with this, high performance processors enabling autonomy, unprecedented mobility through both flying and driving, and a true manipulation capability with a robot hand, can enable much more than sample tube retrieval.

Each sample tube is about 150 grams.

Concept 

The intermediate transportation of the collected samples on the surface of Mars was initially undertaken by the European Space Agency (ESA), which included this project in its ExoMars program. The Mars 2020 mission landed the Perseverance rover, which is storing samples to be returned to Earth later. However, due to repeated postponements, already in November 2021, NASA came to the need to postpone the delivery of samples and assess the risks inherent in the delivery scheme itself in July 2022. The decision was based on the success of Ingenuity.

The NASA-ESA Mars Sample Return mission will not include the ESA Sample Fetch Rover and its associated second lander, but instead use a single lander carrying the helicopters and the ascent rocket that will take the samples to an orbiter, from where they will be launched back to Earth. Mission planners intend that Perseverance itself will retrieve samples that it previously cached on the surface and drive them to the ascent rocket, given its expected longevity. The helicopters, which will be slightly heavier than Ingenuity, would be used as a backup if Perseverance would be unable to perform the task.

Sample Retrieval process 
Recovering a sample will span over four sols (Martian day). On first sol, it from the vicinity of SRL to land near a sample tube. On the next sol, the helicopter will drive to that tube and grab it using its tiny robotic arm. On third sol, it will return back to SRL, and on the last of the four sols its drives into position and releases the sample tube so that the lander's ESA-built sample transfer arm can place tube onto the sample return canister onboard the Mars Ascent Vehicle placed on its deck.

The Sample Recovery Helicopters would take off and land at predetermined sites, or helipads, that have been found suitable and safe, and would use in-flight, map-based navigation to reach the known locations of sample tubes left on the surface.

References

External links 

2026 in the United States
Aircraft with counter-rotating propellers
Coaxial rotor helicopters
Electric helicopters
Extraterrestrial aircraft
Individual space vehicles
Missions to Mars
NASA aircraft
NASA space probes
Unmanned helicopters
Mars robots